is a Japanese politician of the Democratic Party of Japan, a member of the House of Representatives in the Diet (national legislature). A native of Fujisawa, Kanagawa and graduate of Waseda University, he worked at the public broadcaster NHK as a reporter from 1964 to 1989. He was elected to the House of Representatives for the first time in 1990 as a member of the Japan Socialist Party but lost his seat in 1993. He was re-elected in 1996

References

External links
 Official website in Japanese.

Living people
1940 births
People from Fujisawa, Kanagawa
Waseda University alumni
Members of the House of Representatives (Japan)
Social Democratic Party (Japan) politicians
Democratic Party of Japan politicians
21st-century Japanese politicians